Nirahua Chalal London is a 2019 Indian Bhojpuri language action romance drama film directed by Chandra Pant and produced by Sonu Khatri with co-produced by Worldwide Records under banner of "Pashupatinath Production". The film features Dinesh Lal Yadav in the leading role along with Amrapali Dubey while Sunil Thapa, Santosh Mishra, Manoj Tiger, Gopal Rai, Santosh Pahalwan, Sushma Adhikari, Sonu Khatri, Ram Magar, Sabin Sheshtha and Maya Yadav also appear in supporting roles. Sambhavna Seth made a special appearance in the song "Pandit Ji Ka Beta Hai".

The film is the first Bhojpuri film to be:

 Shot Outside India
 Shot in England
 Shot in three different countries; India, Nepal and England.

Plot
The story begins from a village where Nirahua's father wants his son to marry, but Nirahua is not ready for marriage. In London, where Chandrasekhar lives with his entire family, he also has a daughter, Julie. Julie is harassed by a villan named Prabhat for forcibly married. Fed up with Prabhat's threats, Chandrasekhar decides Julie's marriage to Vishambhar Singh's son, but Vishambhar's mother has a condition that the girl knows Indian culture and music and Julie goes to India to learn music. where he meets Nirahua, who is a famous singer and he teaches Julie the music. Nirahua falls in love with Julie at first sight and expresses her love to Julie but Julie refuses him and says that her marriage is fixed. But gradually Julie also falls in love with Nirahua. When Chandrasekhar learns this, he immediately summons Julie to London. Nirahua wants to go to London to marry Julie and also apply for a passport, but does not get passport and is frustrated. There is a TV program in London in which Nirahua performs and he likes Vishambhar and his mother and they invite Nirahua to London where Nirahua performs in Julie's engagement, Julie is happy to see Nirahua in London. When Vishambhar learns that Julie and Nirahua love each others, they get angry and attempt to kill Nirahua but Nirahua escapes from them. Then Prabhat follows them but Chandrasekhar shoots Prabhat and accept Nirahua and Julie's wedding and that's the story of "Nirhua Chalal London".

Cast
Dinesh Lal Yadav as Nirahua
Amrapali Dubey as Julie
Santosh Mishra as Pandit Ji riyaz aly 
Manoj Tiger as Lakhan (Nirahua's friend)
Sunil Thapa as Vishambhar Singh
Sabin Sheshtha as Prabhat
Anoop Arora as Chandrashekhar (Julie's father)
Kiran Yadav as Nirahua's mother
Santosh Pahalwan as Bhola Singh (Julie's uncle)
Gopal Rai as Nirahua's father
Sushma Adhikari as Pandit's love interest
Sonu Khatri as Vishambhar's son
Pushpa Verma as Vishambhar's mother
Sambhavna Seth in a special appearance in the song "Pandit Ji Beta Hai"
Ram Maagar

Release
The film was originally scheduled to release on 25 January 2019 but the release date was pushed by the makers last minute due to unknown reasons. Finally film has arrived in theatres on 15 February 2019, the film has released in Uttar Pradesh, Bihar, Jharkhand, Mumbai, Gujarat and Nepal and he received a bumper opening.

Production
This film has been shot in four different stages in several countries including Mumbai, Nepal and London.

The script of 'Nirahua Chalal London' has been written by Santosh Mishra while music has been composed by Madhukar Anand. The cinematography is by Mankrishna Maharajan and Rameshwar Kari. Kabiraj Gahatraj, Ramji Limechane and Sanjay Karve have choreographed the dance numbers. Chandra Pant has directed the action and stunts in the film. Suraj Khadk is the executive producer of the film and Sunny Shah is the production designer.

Soundtrack

The music of "Nirahua Chalal London" was composed by Madhukar Anand with lyrics penned by Pyare Lal Yadav, Azad Singh, Santosh Puri and Rakesh Nirala.Vidyarthi. The soundtrack included an unusually large number of songs at 9. it was produced under the "Worldwide Records Bhojpuri" Label.

Marketing
First-look poster and teaser was this film was released on occasion of New Year (1 January 2019) and second look poster was released on 11 January 2019 on the occasion of Amrapali Dubey's birthday.

Trailer of "Nirahua Chalal London" was released on 26 February 2018 on YouTube official Channel of "Worldwide Records Bhojpuri" and gots more than 8 millions views on YouTube.

The film was online stream at Online video platform site YouTube on 26 October 2019 at official channel of "Worldwide Records Bhojpuri" and he got 3.2 millions views in just 48 hours. As of May 2020, film had received more than 26 million views on YouTube.

References

2019 films
2010s Bhojpuri-language films